Sardinian refers to anything related to the Mediterranean island of Sardinia. More specifically it can refer to:
Sardinian people
History of Sardinia
Sardinian language
Sardinian literature
Music of Sardinia
Cuisine of Sardinia
Sardinian (sheep)

Language and nationality disambiguation pages

es:Sardo
gl:Sardo
it:Sardo